Las Danna is a tourist resort in Bagh District, Azad Kashmir, Pakistan.

Tourists visit for the area's climate and natural environment. A tourist rest house is located here.

References

Bagh District
Tourist attractions in Azad Kashmir